USCGC William Trump (WPC-1111) is a  cutter of the United States Coast Guard.
When it was delivered to the Coast Guard, on November 25, 2014, it was the eleventh vessel, of its class, and the fifth vessel based in the Coast Guard's station in Key West, Florida.

She has modern electronics, integrating her with the rest of the Coast Guard and is designed for searching for and apprehending smuggling vessels, international refugees, search and rescue, and other constabulary duties. She carries a high-speed jet-boat, that deployed and retrieved via her stern launching ramp. She is armed by a remotely controlled 25 mm autocannon, and four crew served Browning fifty caliber machine guns.

Operational history

On December 24, 2015, William Trump, with other Coast Guard elements, pursued an expensive pleasure-craft stolen from Fort Myers, Florida.
The three suspects, David Llanes Vasquez, Farfan Ramirez-Vidal and Sauri Raul De La Vega, were turned over to the Lee County Sheriff Department, after the stolen vessel had been towed home.

Initially vessels of the Sheriff's department had tried to apprehend the vehicle, which responded by attempting to ram the law enforcement vessel. The Sheriff's department handed the chase over to the Coast Guard when the vessel left their jurisdiction.

On May 5, 2016, the William Trump was mobilized when a report was received that a fishing vessel was firing upon a pleasurecraft 20 miles from one of the Florida keys.  Both vessel were boarded and brought back to port, for an investigation.

In November, 2018, the William Trump, and her sister ship, the Charles Sexton, interdicted 36 Cuban migrants, and repatriated 35 of them to Cabañas, Cuba.  One migrant seemed to suffer a heart attack and was sent to a US port for medical treatment.

Namesake
Like all the vessels in her class William Trump is named after an individual from the Coast Guard's past who has been recognized as a hero.
Her namesake, William Trump, distinguished himself for his heroism helping soldiers land on Omaha Beach, during the Invasion of Normandy, actions that won him a Silver Star.

References

External links

2014 ships
Sentinel-class cutters
Ships built in Lockport, Louisiana